is a railway station in the city of Inazawa, Aichi Prefecture, Japan, operated by Meitetsu.

Lines
Okuda Station is served by the Meitetsu Nagoya Main Line and is 78.8 kilometers from the terminus of the line at Toyohashi Station.

Station layout
The station has two opposed unnumbered side platforms connected by a level crossing. The station has automated ticket machines, Manaca automated turnstiles and is unattended.

Platforms

Adjacent stations

Station history
Okuda Station was opened on February 3, 1928 as a station on the Aichi Electric Railway. On April 1, 1935, the Aichi Electric Railway merged with the Nagoya Railway (the forerunner of present-day Meitetsu).  On September 26, 2002 the station was the site of a fatal accident (the Okuda incident).

Passenger statistics
In fiscal 2017, the station was used by an average of 2,309 passengers daily.

Surrounding area
 Inazawa Higashi High School
 Mitsubishi Electric Inazawa plant

See also
 List of Railway Stations in Japan

References

External links

 Official web page 

Railway stations in Japan opened in 1928
Railway stations in Aichi Prefecture
Stations of Nagoya Railroad
Inazawa